The Kukushka (Russian for "little cuckoo") is a  long narrow-gauge railway line linking the town of Borjomi (820 m asl) to the village and ski resort of Bakuriani (1,700 m asl) in Georgia.

The construction of this  line began in 1897, when Georgia was still part of the Russian Empire. The difficult terrain caused construction to take four years, and the first train ran in January 1902. Gustave Eiffel was commissioned by the Romanovs to design the Eiffel Bridge, Tsagveri over the Tsemistskhali River between the stations of Tsaghveri and Tsemi.

Originally, trains were pulled by a steam engine built by H.K. Porter, imported from America, and passengers travelled in open carriages protected by handrails. The line was electrified in 1966, when the small steam engine was replaced by an electric "crocodile" locomotive made by the Škoda works in Czechoslovakia.

The line is currently operated by Borjomi–Bakuriani Railway LLC (BBR), a subsidiary of Georgian Railways.

Although the line was until 1991 also used to transport andesite from a mine near Bakuriani, the Kukushka is now exclusively a passenger service used by tourists and local residents. Travel time is 2.5 hours (average speed 15 km/h), and there are two trains a day in each direction. Connection to Tbilisi is ensured, but not vice versa.

The train service has stopped as of March 2021. It is not known if it will be continued.

References 

Railway lines in Georgia (country)
900 mm gauge railways in Georgia (country)
Railway lines opened in 1902